Salam Street, now renamed as "Sheikh Zayed bin Sultan Street", and less commonly known as 8th Street or Eastern Ring Road, is one of the main roads in the city of Abu Dhabi. It starts from Sheikh Zayed Bridge and curves its way around Abu Dhabi's eastern end until it ends at the intersection with Corniche Road. Salam Street runs through the main modern shopping area and Robat Street, the new bypass north of the town.

Description 
In earlier years, Salam Street used to end at the intersection with Saada Street (Shakhbout Bin Sultan Street). It as then extended to the end of Abu Dhabi Island and it the turns to end at an intersection with Al Khaleej Al Arabi Street and to intersect with Old Airport Road (Sheikh Rashid Bin Saeed Street) on the way. That turn has been built but is considered as a mere exit from Salam Street instead of an extension.

Intersections 
This is a list of the roads that intersect with Salam Street in order starting from the Corniche Road intersection until the Sheikh Zayed Bridge:
Corniche Road
Khalifa Street (Khalifa Bin Zayed The First Street) (no traffic light)
Mina Street
Hamdan Street
Electra Street (Zayed The First Street)
Abu Dhabi Mall Road (13th Street)
19th Street
Falah Street
Hazza ' Bin Zayed Street
Sea Palace Road
Saada Street (Shakhbout Bin Sultan Street)
23rd Street
25th Street
29th Street
31st Street

Attractions 

Along the road, there are several sights to be seen:
Mangroves at Mangrove National Park, near Al Qurn Corniche (Al-Qurm meaning "The Mangrove"). The corniche is popular amongst residents of Abu Dhabi as a leisure spot.
Khalifa Park
ADCB Headquarters
Geneva Clock
Abu Dhabi Municipality Building
ADNOC Headquarters
National Drilling Company Headquarters
UNB Headquarters
Sheraton Beach Resort
Lulu Center
Corniche Hospital

See also
 Zayed Bin Sultan Street in Al Ain, which connects the Emirate of Abu Dhabi to Oman

References

Streets in Abu Dhabi